The 2001–02 Australian Figure Skating Championships was held in North Ryde from 1 through 8 December 2001. Skaters competed in the disciplines of men's singles, ladies' singles, and ice dancing across many levels, including senior, junior, novice, adult, and the pre-novice disciplines of primary and intermediate.

Senior results

Men

Ladies

Ice dancing

External links
 results

2001 in figure skating
2002 in figure skating
Fig
Fig
Australian Figure Skating Championships